The Duke of York Archipelago is an uninhabited island group in the Kitikmeot Region, Nunavut, Canada. It is located in the Coronation Gulf.

The archipelago is composed of the islands of Akvitlak Islands, Anchor Island, Bate Islands, Hatoayok Island, Hokagon Island, Kabviukvik Island, Kingak Island, Mangak Island, Nagyuktok Island (historical home to Nagyuktogmiut, or Killinermiut, Copper Inuit) Nanukton Island, Outpost Islands, and Takhoalok Island.

References

Islands of Coronation Gulf
Uninhabited islands of Kitikmeot Region
Victoria Island (Canada)
Former populated places in the Kitikmeot Region